Radium Round is the eighth studio album by the Finnish avant-garde progressive metal band Waltari.

Track listing

 "Back To The Bottom" - 3:56
 "Every Bad Day" - 3:44
 "Broken Bizarre" - 3:13
 "Power Of Thoughts" - 4:34
 "Atom Angel" - 3:50
 "Number None" - 3:47
 "Radium Round" - 3:23
 "Love Rocket" - 4:16
 "The Plan" - 5:14
 "City Neurotic" - 4:23
 "Scum" - 4:46
 "4000 Years" - 4:37

Credits

Kärtsy Hatakka - Vocals, bass, programming, keyboards
Jariot Lehtinen - Guitar, vocals
Roope Latvala - Guitar
Janne Parviainen - Drums

Charts

References

External links
Encyclopaedia Metallum page

Waltari albums
1999 albums